Konitz is an album by saxophonist and bandleader Lee Konitz featuring performances recorded in 1954 which was originally released as a 10-inch LP on George Wein's Storyville label. The album was rereleased with additional alternate takes on CD in 1989 on the Black Lion label.

Reception

The Allmusic review by Scott Yanow stated "The 1954 Lee Konitz Quartet did not last long but they did record some worthwhile performances that still sound fresh over 40 years later. ... Altoist Konitz is ably assisted by pianist Ronnie Ball, bassist Peter Ind and drummer Jeff Morton on cool/bop performances which give one a good sampling of how Konitz sounded in his early prime".

Track listing
All compositions by Lee Konitz except where noted
 "Bop Goes the Leesel" [Take 5] (Warne Marsh) – 2:12
 "Easy Livin'" (Ralph Rainger, Leo Robin) – 3:08
 "Mean to Me" [Take 4] (Fred E. Ahlert, Roy Turk) – 3:49
 "I'll Remember April" [Take 3] (Gene de Paul, Patricia Johnston, Don Raye) – 5:38
 "317 East 32nd" (Lennie Tristano) – 4:02
 "Skylark" (Hoagy Carmichael, Johnny Mercer) – 3:05
 "Nursery Rhyme" [Take 12] – 3:16
 "Limehouse Blues" (Philip Braham, Douglas Furber) – 3:05
 "Bop Goes the Leesel" [Take 1] (Marsh) – 2:44 Bonus track on CD reissue 
 "Bop Goes the Leesel" [Take 2] (Marsh) – 2:51 Bonus track on CD reissue 
 "Mean to Me" [Take 1] (Ahlert, Turk) – 3:39 Bonus track on CD reissue 
 "Nursery Rhyme' [Take 1] – 3:38 Bonus track on CD reissue 
 "Nursery Rhyme" [Take 4] – 3:13 Bonus track on CD reissue 
 "Nursery Rhyme" [Take 5] – 3:55 Bonus track on CD reissue

Personnel
Lee Konitz – alto saxophone
Ronnie Ball – piano
Peter Ind – bass
Jeff Morton – drums

References

Lee Konitz albums
1954 albums
Storyville Records (George Wein's) albums
Black Lion Records albums